Elections to the Provincial Assembly of Balochistan were held in 1990.

Results

Further reading

References 

Elections in Balochistan
1990 elections in Pakistan